Lepthoplosternum beni is a species of catfish of the family Callichthyidae.  It is found in the upper Madeira River basin in Bolivia and Peru.

References
 

Callichthyidae
Fish of South America
Fish of Bolivia
Fish of Peru
Taxa named by Roberto Esser dos Reis
Fish described in 1997